Órfhlaith Foyle is an Irish novelist and poet.

Foyle was born in Nigeria to Irish missionary parents, living there as well as Kenya and Malawi, all of which had a profound effect upon her writing. 

She has a Bachelor in Humanities, and is a full-time writer, who has been published in a number of literary journals.  Foyle has also lived in Australia, France, Russia, Israel and the United Kingdom, and now lives in Galway, Ireland. 

Her publications to date include a novel and a book of poetry. A second novel is forthcoming. Her cited influences include Flannery O'Connor, Katherine Mansfield, Emily Brontë and Emily Dickinson.

Selected works
 Belios, Lilliput Press, 2005 - novel
 Revenge, Arlen House, 2005 - mixed collection
 Red Riding Hood's Dilemma, Arlen House, 2010 - poetry, nominated for the Rupert and Eithne Strong Award
 Somewhere In Minnesota, Arlen House 2011 - short story collection
 Clemency Browne Dreams of Gin, Arlen House 2014

External links
 http://www.saltpublishing.com/horizon/issues/03/text/foyle_orfhlaith.htm
 http://writerscentre.ie/blog/?p=295
 http://www.lilliputpress.ie/listbook.html?id=312

References

Irish poets
People from County Galway
Living people
Irish women poets
Year of birth missing (living people)
Irish people of Nigerian descent